Kerry S. Harris (born December 8, 1969) is an American entrepreneur and inventor. Harris is involved with motorcycle helmets under the brand name Akuma Helmets utilizing his patented Integrated Power System. The Integrated Power System is also used in various other helmets to include bicycle, law enforcement, and other sports related industries to increase safety and provide greater utility. Harris' innovations are currently being used by the Departments of Defense of several countries to include impact attenuation (helmets), electronics, optical technology, and human-mechanical interface technology.

Biography 
A veteran of both the United States Navy and United States Marine Corps, Harris served 18 years as an enlisted sailor, a Marine Corps officer, and a Naval Aviator.

During his junior year at Southwest Texas State University in San Marcos, Texas, he attended officer candidate school for the United States Marine Corps and accepted a commission as a Second Lieutenant after graduation. After a three-year tour in the Marine Corps, Harris transferred back to the Navy to attend flight school, earning his wings of gold to fly P-3 Orions.

Harris has been a guest speaker at Harvard Business School. He is a member of the national honor society in Psychology (Psi Chi). He is also a pilot and maintains a commercial pilot's license with multi-engine and instrument ratings. In March 2012, Harris was named "Innovator of the Year" by Black Enterprise magazine.

Notes

Sources

Further reading
 Aerospace and Defense News 
 
 
 
 
 

1969 births
21st-century American businesspeople
Living people
United States Navy sailors
United States Marine Corps officers
Texas State University alumni
21st-century American inventors
African-American businesspeople
African-American inventors
21st-century African-American people
20th-century African-American people
African-American United States Navy personnel